The Cap de Creus (Cabo de Creus in Spanish) is a peninsula and a headland located at the far northeast of Catalonia, some  south from the French border. The cape lies in the municipal area of Cadaqués, and the nearest large town is Figueres, capital of the Alt Empordà and birthplace of Salvador Dalí. Cap de Creus is the easternmost point of Catalonia and therefore of mainland Spain and the Iberian Peninsula.

The area is now a Natural Park.

Mountains are the eastern foothills of the Pyrenees, the natural border between France and Spain. The region is frequently swept by awful north wind "tramontana" (beyond mountains) which has caused many naval disasters. Cadaqués is the most well known village, home of artists and writers, with sophisticated atmosphere, near Port Lligat where Dalí built his home in a paradise small bay. (Dalí depicted the peninsula in his paintings The Persistence of Memory and The Great Masturbator.) El Port de la Selva, with a little fishing harbour, is less exploited, with good gastronomic resources and pleasant terraces.

It is an 11th-century monastery whose first structures date from about 750 AD.

One legend tells that the Cap de Creus was hewn by Hercules.

See also
 Extreme points of Catalonia

References

External links 
The Cap de Creus

Headlands of Catalonia
Natural parks of Catalonia
Extreme points of Spain